
 
UNFPA Goodwill Ambassador is an official postnominal honorific title, title of authority, legal status and job description assigned to those goodwill ambassadors and advocates who are designated by the United Nations. UNFPA goodwill ambassadors are celebrity advocates of the United Nations Population Fund (UNFPA) and use their talent and fame to advocate for the human right of reproductive health.

Current UNFPA goodwill ambassadors
The current goodwill ambassadors, and the year they were appointed:

See also 
 Goodwill Ambassador
 FAO Goodwill Ambassador
 UNDP Goodwill Ambassador
 UNHCR Goodwill Ambassador
 UNESCO Goodwill Ambassador
 UNODC Goodwill Ambassador
 UN Women Goodwill Ambassador
 UNIDO Goodwill Ambassador
 UNICEF Goodwill Ambassador
 WFP Goodwill Ambassador
 WHO Goodwill Ambassador

References

External links 
UNFPA Goodwill Ambassadors

United Nations Population Fund
Goodwill ambassador programmes
United Nations goodwill ambassadors